Tripotassium phosphate, also called tribasic potassium phosphate is a water-soluble salt with the chemical formula K3PO4.(H2O)x (x = 0, 3, 7, 9). Tripotassium phosphate is basic.

Production 
Tripotassium phosphate is produced by the neutralization of phosphoric acid:
H3PO4 + 3KOH -> K3PO4 + 3H2O

Use in organic chemistry 

Tripotassium phosphate has few industrial applications.

It is used as an inert, easily removed proton acceptor in organic synthesis. Some of the reactions are listed below:
 The hydrate (K3PO4\cdot H2O) has been used to catalyze the deprotection of BOC amines. Microwave radiation is used to aid the reaction.
 As a catalyst for the synthesis of unsymmetrical diaryl ethers using [Bmim]BF4 as the solvent. Aryl methane-sulfonates are deprotected and then followed by a nucleophilic aromatic substitution (SNAr) with activated aryl halides.
 As a base in the cross-coupling reaction of aryl halides with terminal alkynes. It also plays a role in the deacetonation of 4-aryl-2-methylbut-3-yn-2-ol intermediates.
 As the base in the cross-coupling reaction between aryl halides and phenols or aliphatic alcohols.

Use in foods 
Tripotassium phosphate can be used in foods as a buffering agent, emulsifying agent, and for nutrient fortification.  It can serve as a sodium-free substitute for trisodium phosphate.  The ingredient is most common in dry cereals but is also found in meat, sauces, and cheeses.

Hazards 
It is somewhat basic: a 1% aqueous solution has a pH of 11.8.

References

Potassium compounds
Phosphates
Food emulsifiers
E-number additives
Inorganic fertilizers